The Tower of Light is a former transmission tower in Sanmin District, Kaohsiung, Taiwan.

History
The tower was originally used by Taipower as high voltage transmission tower. With the construction of underground power cable, the tower was on the brink of being scrapped. The Kaohsiung City Government then actively persuaded Taipower to retain one tower for commemorative purpose. After successfully lobbying for a budget of NT$40 million, ecological concepts were incorporated into the design to use solar power to illuminate the tower.

Architecture
The tower also features a display of various sizes of insulators and a small climbing wall at its side.

Transportation
The tower is accessible within walking distance west of Houyi Station of Kaohsiung MRT.

See also
 List of tourist attractions in Taiwan
 Electricity sector in Taiwan

References

Buildings and structures in Kaohsiung
Electric power infrastructure in Taiwan
Pylons
Tourist attractions in Kaohsiung
Towers in Taiwan